The , is the national federation for Aquatics in Japan. It oversees Japan's Swimming, Diving, Water Polo and Synchronized Swimming competitive programs. It was founded on October 31, 1924. It is affiliated to FINA, the Asia Swimming Federation, the Japanese Olympic Committee and the Japan Amateur Sports Association.

Presidents

Championships
Japan Swimming Championships (50m)
Japan Swimming Championships (25m)
Japan Diving Cup
Japan Open (Swimming)
Japan Open (synchronized swimming)
Japan College Aquatics Championships
Japan High School Aquatics Championships
Japan Junior High School Aquatics Championships
JOC Junior Olympic Cup

See also
 website: www.swim.or.jp
Tokyo Tatsumi International Swimming Center

References

National members of the Asian Swimming Federation
Japan
Swimming
Swimming organizations
Swimming in Japan